Feeling Strangely Fine is the second studio album by American rock band Semisonic. It is the follow up to the band's debut album Great Divide recorded at Seedy Underbelly Studio in Minneapolis, Minnesota. The album contains some of Semisonic's best-known songs, including the major radio hit "Closing Time", as well as the singles "Singing in My Sleep" and "Secret Smile". The song "Never You Mind" was featured in the 1999 film Never Been Kissed.

Recording
The band had over 60 new songs in mind as they went into the recording process and had three specific requirements when they decided they wanted to record a new album. First, they didn't want to record any demotapes beyond simple guitar and vocal basement sketches, meaning the album versions would be the first band recordings of the songs. Second, they wanted no deadline for the finished masters. Third, the trio wanted to create tracks for the album in various hi- and lo-tech settings around Minneapolis, and use their computers to meld the different sounds together. Nick Launay was brought in to produce the album and the band recorded twenty songs over the course of four months. They pared those down to sixteen, mixed them, and used the best twelve for the finished record.

Track listing
All tracks written by Dan Wilson unless otherwise noted.

20th Anniversary Edition Bonus Tracks

Personnel
Semisonic
John Munson – bass guitar (all tracks), background vocals (all tracks except 11), lead vocals (track 11), additional guitar (track 2), all guitars (track 11), wah wah guitar (track 12), trembly guitar (track 4), Moog synthesizer (tracks 5, 7, 8), slide guitar solo (track 6), Moog bass (track 10), piano (track 1), loops (track 10)
Jacob Slichter – drums (all tracks), background vocals (all tracks), conducting (tracks 1, 5, 6, 12), piano (tracks 8, 9, 11), string arrangement (tracks 1, 5, 12), Rhodes electric piano (track 3), Wurlitzer electric piano (tracks 2), mellotron (track 11), Moog synthesizer (track 8), loops (track 10), flute arrangement (track 5)
Dan Wilson – lead vocals (all tracks except 11), background vocals (track 11), guitar (all tracks except 11), piano (tracks 3, 4, 7), string arrangement (tracks 5, 6), Rhodes electric piano (track 5), synth whistle (track 4), drum loops (track 6), flute arrangement (track 5)

Additional personnel
Bruce Allard – strings (tracks 1, 5, 6, 12)
Mary Bahr – strings (tracks 1, 5, 6, 12)
Carolyn Boulay – strings (tracks 1, 5, 6, 12)
Troy Gardner – strings (tracks 1, 5, 6, 12)
Josh Koestenbaum – strings (tracks 1, 5, 6, 12)
Matt Wilson – lead guitar (track 4)

Charts

Weekly charts

Year-end charts

Certifications

References

Semisonic albums
1998 albums
Albums produced by Nick Launay
MCA Records albums